The 2009 WPS Draft took place on January 16, 2009.  It was the first draft held by Women's Professional Soccer to assign the WPS rights of college players to the American-based teams, though other players not previously assigned could be drafted as well.

Round 1

Round 2

Round 3

Round 4

Round 5

Round 6

Round 7

Round 8

Round 9

Round 10

Draft notes

See also
List of foreign WPS players

External links
Complete draft coverage

2009
Draft
WPS Draft